Comamonas jiangduensis is a Gram-negative, non-spore-forming and motile bacterium from the genus Comamonas which has been isolated from soil from a rice field in Jiangdu in China.

References

External links 

Type strain of Comamonas jiangduensis at BacDive -  the Bacterial Diversity Metadatabase

Comamonadaceae
Bacteria described in 2013